The akçe or akça (also spelled akche, akcheh;) refers to a silver coin which was the chief monetary unit of the Ottoman Empire. The word itself evolved from the word "silver or silver money", this word is derived from the Turkish ak ("white") and the diminutive suffix -ça. Three akçes were equal to one para. One-hundred and twenty akçes equalled one kuruş. Later after 1687 the kuruş became the main unit of account, replacing the akçe. In 1843, the silver kuruş was joined by the gold lira in a bimetallic system. Its weight fluctuated, one source estimates it is between 1.15 and 1.18 grams. The name akçe originally referred to a silver coin but later the meaning changed and it became a synonym for money.

The mint in Novo Brdo, a fortified mining town in the Serbian Despotate rich with gold and silver mines, began to strike akçe in 1441 when it was captured by the Ottoman forces for the first time.

The Suleiman Mosque in Istanbul is said to have cost 59 million akçe when it was constructed in the 1550s. This amount is said to have equalled 700,000 ducats in gold (probably Venetian).

Devaluation

Weight of akçe in grams of silver and index.

See also

Akşa

References

External links 
 Ottoman coins
 September 1, 2013 - A huge treasure of 47,000 silver Akçe discovered in Goleşti, Romania
 Akçe, 1481: Crimean Khanate (Ottoman Empire)

Coins of the Ottoman Empire
Silver coins
Medieval currencies